The Miss Ecuador 1979 was an event held at Telecentro. The winner, Anita Plaza from Guayas, competed at Miss Universe 1979. Another contestant, Lourdes Padilla from Guayas would compete at Miss World 1979.

Result

External links

Miss Ecuador